Richard Feynman (1918 –  1988) was an American theoretical physicist and popular author, who received the Nobel Prize in Physics in 1965 jointly with Julian Schwinger and Shin'ichirō Tomonaga.

Physics techniques and problems named after Feynman
 Bethe–Feynman formula
 Feynman's algorithm
 Feynman–Kac formula 
 Feynman–Kleinert Quasi-Classical Wigner method
 Feynman checkerboard
 Feynman diagram
Feynman rules
 One-loop Feynman diagram
 Feynman gauge
 Feynman path integral
 Feynman parametrization
 Feynman propagator
 Feynman slash notation 
 Feynman–Smoluchowski ratchet
 Feynman sprinkler
 Heaviside–Feynman formula
 Hellmann–Feynman theorem
 Stückelberg–Feynman interpretation
 Wheeler–Feynman absorber theory

Other things named after Feynman
7495 Feynman, asteroid
Feynmanium, a theoretical chemical element with atomic number Z = 137
 Feynman point (not connected to Feynman)
 Feynman Technique
 Feynman Prize in Nanotechnology

See also
 Feynman (disambiguation)

Feynman
Richard Feynman